Polacanthoides (meaning Polacanthus like) is an extinct genus of nodosaurid dinosaur from Europe. It lived about 140 to 135 million years ago in what is now England. It was named by Nopsca in 1928. The type specimen is BMNH 2584. It is a possible junior synonym of Hylaeosaurus and Polacanthus. It is now considered to be a nomen dubium or a chimera.

See also
 Timeline of ankylosaur research

References

External links

Nodosaurids
Valanginian life
Early Cretaceous dinosaurs of Europe
Cretaceous England
Fossils of England
Fossil taxa described in 1928
Paleontological chimeras
Ornithischian genera